Elżbieta Anna Polak (born 6 September 1959 in Przemków, Poland) is a Polish politician and the current Marshal of Lubusz Voivodeship since November 2010.

References

External links
 Biography

Civic Platform politicians
Living people
1959 births
Voivodeship marshals of Poland
Lubusz Voivodeship
Women governors and heads of sub-national entities